Sawgrass may refer to:

Saw grass, a common name of some species of plants in the genus Cladium
Sawgrass, Florida, a town in the United States

Sawgrass Country Club, a private golf and tennis club located in Ponte Vedra Beach, Florida
Sawgrass Expressway, Florida State Road 869
Sawgrass Lake Park, a park located in Pinellas County, Florida
Sawgrass Lake, a lake in Brevard County, Florida, United States
Sawgrass Mills in Sunrise, Florida; the world's largest outlet mall
TPC at Sawgrass, a golf course in Ponte Vedra Beach, Florida, United States; the golf course hosts The Players Championship